Sphinctomyrmex marcoyi is a Neotropical species of ants in the subfamily Dorylinae. It is the only Sphinctomyrmex species recorded in the Amazon Forest. Gynes and males are unknown.

Description
S. marcoyi is known only from the holotype, a worker collected from a soil sample. Nothing is known about its biology. S. marcoyi can be easily separated from other species in the genus by its comparatively diminutive size, conspicuously elongate head, comparatively short scapes, and by the presence of a smooth longitudinal stripe on the dorsum of mesosoma, which is otherwise covered by foveolae and subdecumbent to erect hairs.

References

Dorylinae
Insects described in 2011
Hymenoptera of South America